The 2011 São Tomé (Island or Regional) Second Division took place that season. 

The division featured two zones (sometimes as groups), A & B.  The first place of each zone heads to the Second Division championships and the winner was crowned Second Division Champions, all of its finals participants qualified into the Premier Division in the following season including Futebol Club Aliança Nacional (Zone A) and Agrosport (Zone B). Agrosport won the Second Division title after succeeding in away goals as the first leg had a goal draw while the second leg was scoreless.

It was also the final season that each of the last placed clubs of each group were not relegated, the Third Division was created in the following season on the island.

Teams

Zone A 
 Futebol Club Aliança Nacional - succeeded into the final
 Inter Bom-Bom 
 Os Dinâmicos - Folha Fede
 Juba Diogo Simão 
 Palmar 
 Porto Alegre 
 Santa Margarida 
 Trindade FC 
 Varzim FC - Ribeira Afonso

Zone B 
 Agrosport  - Monte Café - succeeded into the final
 Amador - Agostinho Neto
 Andorinha Sport Club 
 Bela Vista  - in the following season, the club would change its name to Kë Morabeza
 Desportivo Conde 
 Correia 
 Diogo Vaz 
 Desportivo Marítimo - Micoló
 Sporting São Tomé

References

Football competitions in São Tomé and Príncipe
Sao Tome
Sao Tome Second Division